Elsa Tee (1917–2006) was a British actress.

Selected filmography
 Heaven Is Round the Corner (1944)
 Twilight Hour (1944)
 Here Comes the Sun (1946)
 Death in High Heels (1947) 
 School for Randle (1949)

References

External links

1917 births
2006 deaths
British film actresses
20th-century British actresses